Kim Jun-young (born September 25, 1951) is a South Korean economist, professor, and the current 19th president of Sungkyunkwan University. Under his leadership, the university has made globalisation a top priority, actively seeking partnerships with foreign universities to expand two-way student exchange. Kim is one of Korea's leading experts on macroeconomics, and he still teaches a popular class on the subject, rare for a Korean university president. He has published numerous books on the subject, including one bestseller, Macroeconomics.

Education 
He received his Bachelor of Economics from Sungkyunkwan University in 1975.
He received his MS in 1979 and PhD in 1984, both from the Graduate School of Economics of University of Minnesota.
He received an honorary doctorate of Law from National Chengchi University in 2011.

Career 

 October 1973: passed higher administration exam (14th)
 1989: began working as a professor for SKKU's School of Economics
 August 1992 ~ August 1993: Harvard University visiting professor
 March 1996 ~ February 1998: Sungkyunkwan University Dean of School of Economics 
 April 1996 ~ May 1998: Korea Institute of Public Finance director
 June 1996 ~ May 1998: Korean Journal of Local Finance director
 1996 ~ present: Bank of Korea member
 January 1997 ~ December 2002: Sweden International Social Security Association editorial board
 January 1998 ~ December 2002: Sweden International Social Security Association councilor
 February 1998 ~ December 2002: Korea Economic Association director
 March 1998 ~ February 1999: Korea International Economic Association director
 April 1998 ~ June 2002: Korea Institute of Finance auditor 
 April 2001 ~ June 2002: Korea Institute of Finance chairman (17th)
 February 2003 ~ March 2004: Sungkyunkwan University provost
 April 2004 ~ March 2006: Sungkyunkwan University School of Planning and Coordination director
 February 2007 ~ January 2011: Sungkyunkwan University Humanities and Social Sciences Campus Vice Chancellor
 August 2007 ~ July 2008: Ministry of Finance and Economy Development Review Committee member
 May 2008 ~ April 2010: Ministry of Education, Science and Technology Higher Education Policy Advisory Committee member
 September 2009 ~ August 2010: Ministry of Finance and Economy Waterfront Policy Advisory Committee Chairman
 September 2009 ~ August 2010:  Ministry of Education, Science and Technology Conflict Management Committee Chairman
 September 2009 ~ August 2011:  Ministry of Education, Science and Technology  University Advancement Committee Chairman
 June 2010 ~ 2013 June: Customs Administration Development Review Committee Chairman
 September 2010 ~ present: North American Association of Higher Education Director
 January 2011 ~ present: Sungkyunkwan University President (19th)
 April 2012 ~ April 2014: Korea Council for University Education Vice-President
 April 2013 ~ March 2014: Korea Private University Presidents Council President (16th)
 April 2014 ~ present: Korean Council for University Education President

References 

1951 births
Academic staff of Sungkyunkwan University
Sungkyunkwan University alumni
University of Minnesota College of Liberal Arts alumni
Living people
Macroeconomists
Academic administration
People from Sangju
South Korean economists